Seahorses Mikawa is a Japanese professional basketball team located in Kariya and sponsored by Aisin. The team was founded in 1947.  The team  played in the National Basketball League. In July 2015 it was announced that the team will compete in the first division of the new Japan Professional Basketball League, which commenced in October 2016.

History
Throughout the past decade, the team has been led by head coach Kimikazu Suzuki and naturalized big man J. R. Sakuragi, who led the SeaHorses to decades of success, including numerous titles in Japan's prime basketball league.

Championships
 JBL Super League: 5
2003, 2004, 2008, 2009, 2013
 Challenge Cup: 1
2007
 Emperor's Cup: 2
2009, 2013

Current roster

Notable players

To appear in this section a player must have either:
- Set a club record or won an individual award as a professional player.
- Played at least one official international match for his senior national team at any time.
- Played at least one official regular season game in the NBA.

Arenas

Wing Arena Kariya
Okazaki Central Park General Gymnasium
Sky Hall Toyota

Practice facilities

Aisin Seiki Gymnasium

References

External links

Historical Finishes
Team Profile

 
Basketball teams in Japan
Sport in Kariya, Aichi
Basketball teams established in 1947
1947 establishments in Japan